The 1944 United States Senate election in Arkansas took place on November 7, 1944. Incumbent Senator Hattie Caraway ran for a third term in office, but was eliminated in the Democratic primary. U.S. Representative J. William Fulbright defeated Governor Homer Martin Adkins in the Democratic runoff.

Fulbright easily defeated Republican Victor Wade in the general election, in a landslide victory typical for Arkansas Democrats at the time.

Democratic primary

Candidates
Homer Martin Adkins, Governor of Arkansas since 1941
L. H. Barton
Hattie Caraway, incumbent U.S. Senator since 1931
J. William Fulbright, U.S. Representative from Fayettteville and former University of Arkansas professor
J. Rosser Venable, candidate for Senate in 1936

Results

Runoff

General election

Results

See also
1944 United States Senate elections

References 

1944
Arkansas
United States Senate